Stemat Marine Services was a service company (within the VolkerWessels group) for maritime work, based in Rotterdam, Netherlands.

Stemat started with a few vessels in 1986, expanding to a fleet of more than 50 vessels. In the port in Rotterdam, Stemat had over 14,500m² of harbor space, 160m of wharf, frontage, and 13,500 m² of storage space. The wharf was equipped with mobile cranes with a hoisting capacity of up to 23 tons.

Stemat owned a wide variety of modern equipment, including multi-purpose vessels, crane barges, pontoons, pushers, and tug boats.

In 2016, Stemat was acquired by Boskalis.

Fleet
Anna B - DP2 Multi purpose vessel - Dimensions: 32,0 x 12,0 x 3,4/4,0m 
Brigit P - Geophysical and hydrographical survey vessel - Dimensions: 28,50 x 6,60 x 3,80m 
Dina M - Crane barge - Dimensions: 60,0 x 22,4 x 4,0m 
Fenna B - Multi purpose vessel - Dimensions: 26,5 x 11,0 x 3,5/3,7m 
Fetsy L - Multi purpose barge - Dimensions: 60,0 x 20,0 x 3,0m 
Inge W - Tug - Dimensions: 32,3 x 10,0 x 3,6m 
Kim K - Multi purpose vessel - Dimensions: 21,6 x 9,0 x 3,0m 
Liz V - 24 passenger High Speed Crew Tender - Dimensions: 31,3 x 7,4 x 3,5m
Lydia D - Multi purpose AHT - Dimensions: 31,1 x 10,0 x 3,5m 
Marian V - Tug / Supply vessel - Dimensions: 29,1 x 9,5m 
Naomi E - Multi purpose vessel - Dimensions: 22,6 x 9,5 x 2,8m 
Nova K - Multi purpose vessel - Dimensions: 32,0 x 11,1 x 3,5m 
Pontra Maris - Multi purpose barge - Dimensions: 70,0 x 23,8 x 5,7m 
Rebecca S - Multi purpose vessel - Dimensions: 26,0 x 9,5 x 2,8m 
Sidi C - Multi purpose vessel - Dimensions: 32,0 x 11,1 x 3,7m 
Stemat 63 - Multi purpose barge - Dimensions: 50,0 x 20,0 x 3,0m 
Stemat 82 - Multi purpose barge - Dimensions: 80,0 x 28,0 x 6,0m 
Stemat 89 - Multi purpose barge - Dimensions: 80,0 x 24,0 x 5,0mm 
Stemat Spirit - DP2 special service workboat - Dimensions: 90,0 x 28,0 x 6,5m 
Suzanne D - Multi purpose vessel - Dimensions: 26,0 x 9,5 x 2,8m 
Tessa W - Multi purpose vessel - Dimensions: 25,1 x 9,9 x 3,5m 
Yvonne W - Multi purpose vessel - Dimensions: 26,5 x 11,0 x 3,2/3,7m

References

Shipping companies of the Netherlands